Dennis Michael Butler (born 7 March 1943) is an English former professional footballer who played as a centre-back.

Club career
Born in Fulham, Butler started his career with Surrey Boys before joining Chelsea, where he won the FA Youth Cup in 1960 and 1961. He made his first-team debut on 18 November 1961, in a 2–2 draw at Manchester City. He went on to make eighteen appearances before moving to Hull City in June 1963. After 217 league appearances, he moved to Reading, where he made 169 league appearances.

After leaving the professional game, Butler moved to non-League side Margate in 1974.

Coaching career
Butler coached at Rochdale and Bury.

Honours
Chelsea
FA Youth Cup: 1960, 1961

References

1943 births
Living people
Footballers from Fulham
Footballers from Greater London
English footballers
Association football defenders
Chelsea F.C. players
Hull City A.F.C. players
Reading F.C. players
Margate F.C. players
English Football League players